Jaroslav Huleš (2 July 1974 – 7 July 2004) was a Grand Prix motorcycle road racer from the Czech Republic. He died a few days after his 30th birthday, following a suicide attempt on that day, leaving a four-year-old son. After racing at European Championship level, he raced in the 125cc World Championship in 2000, peaking with 8th place at Donington Park. Results improved in 2001, with 11 points finishes with the best result of 6th at the Circuit de Barcelona-Catalunya. He also raced in 2002, but scored no points before a few late-season 250cc outings on a Yamaha.

Career statistics

Races by year
(key) (Races in italics indicate fastest lap)

References

Czech motorcycle racers
125cc World Championship riders
250cc World Championship riders
Suicides in the Czech Republic
1974 births

2004 suicides